The Vienna Philharmonic, often shortened to Philharmonic, is a bullion coin of gold, silver, or platinum produced by the Austrian Mint (Münze Österreich). The coin is named for the Vienna Philharmonic orchestra, which inspired the design of both sides. It was introduced in 1989 as a one-troy ounce (ozt), gold coin with a face value of 2,000 Austrian schillings. It is generally one of the world's best selling bullion coins. In 2002, with the adoption of the euro currency, the nominal value of the one-ounce coin was changed to 100 euros. In 2008, the Mint introduced a one-ounce silver version of the coin with a nominal value of 1.50 euros. The silver coin is also one of the top selling bullion coins, ranked third in 2013. In 2016, the mint introduced a one ounce platinum coin with a face value of 100 euros.

Like any bullion coin, the value is based primarily on the metal content and the spot price of that metal on the commodities markets. The gold Philharmonic has a fineness of 999.9 (often written 0.9999, also known as 24 carat or 99.99% pure). In most countries in Europe, the gold Philharmonic is traded VAT-free while the Silver Philharmonic is partly subject to a reduced VAT rate. The coins are minted according to demand and production varies from year to year accordingly. The design on the coin remains the same each year; only the year of issue changes. From the outset, the obverse of the coin depicts the pipe organ in the Vienna Musikverein's Golden Hall. The reverse of the coin shows instruments of the Vienna Philharmonic, including Vienna horn, bassoon, harp, and four violins centered on a cello. Both designs were produced by the chief engraver of the Austrian Mint, Thomas Pesendorfer.

History 
In November 1988, the Austrian Mint was authorized to produce one-ounce and fractional-ounce gold bullion coins by the Austrian National Council.
The gold Vienna Philharmonic was first offered on October 10, 1989, and was initially minted in two sizes: one-ounce and one-quarter ounce. The one-tenth and one-half ounce coins were added in 1991 and 1994 respectively. All coins feature the same design with the only difference being the weight and face value shown. The popularity of the Vienna Philharmonic grew quickly: in 1990, the coin was the best selling in Europe and second in the world. In 1992, 1995, 1996 and 2000 the World Gold Council declared it the best-selling gold coin in the world. Since its introduction in October 1989 up to 2012, more than 14 million Philharmonics have been sold for a total weight of 9.6 million ounces or approximately 329 tons of gold.

After the introduction of the euro, Philharmoincs began to be minted with a face value denominated in the new currency starting in 2002. Since February 1, 2008, a one-ounce silver version of the coin with a nominal value of 1.50 euros has been issued, struck from 99.9 percent pure silver. Unlike the reeded edge of the gold coin, the edge of the silver coins are smooth. Coins are shipped in boxes of 500, called "monster boxes." Each monster box consists of 25 tubes of 20 coins each. Sales of the silver Philharmonic have been brisk with over five million coins sold, equal to 1,800 tons of silver in the 5-year period of 2008 through 2012.

The mint introduced a one-ounce platinum coin with the same design as the gold and silver in 2016. Like the gold coin, it has a face value of 100 euros. The purity is shown as 999.5 with the obverse of the coin reading "1 UNZE PLATIN 999.5."

The Vienna Philharmonic is currently the only European bullion coin with a face value in euros, although it is only legal tender in Austria. In 2004, the Vienna Philharmonic accounted for 35 to 40 percent of sales in Europe. It is also popular in Japan and North America.

For the 25th anniversary of the Vienna Philharmonic gold coin, the mint introduced the -ounce coin featuring the same design, but with a face value of 4.00 euros. Also for the anniversary, 5,000 proof sets of the one-ounce and one-quarter ounce coins were produced. The -ounce coin has been continued in production.

Design 

The design for the coin was originally created by Thomas Pesendorfer to be used for the gold Vienna Philharmonic that was first issued in 1989. The Austrian Mint introduced the silver version of the coin in 2008. The design was unchanged and has remained the same each year.

The obverse features the pipe organ from Golden Hall in the Musikverein, the concert hall in Vienna where the namesake orchestra plays. The German words "" (Republic of Austria), the composition and the weight are also minted on the obverse. The reverse design features an array of musical instruments including a harp, violins, a cello, a bassoon, and a Vienna horn. The words "" (Vienna Philharmonic) is also inscribed, as well as "" (Silver) or "" (Platinum) on the respective coins.

Gold Philharmonic specifications:

Silver Philharmonic specifications:

Platinum Philharmonic specifications:

Variations

"Big Phil" 

For the 15th anniversary of the Vienna Philharmonic bullion coin in 2004, the Austrian Mint created a 1,000-troy ounce version with nominal value 100,000 euros. It was one of the largest coins with the highest denomination until it was eclipsed in 2007 by the Royal Canadian Mint's  version of the Canadian Gold Maple Leaf with a face value of 1,000,000 Canadian dollars. In keeping with the 15th anniversary theme, only fifteen 100,000-euro Philharmonics were produced. The coin was unveiled in front of the Wiener Riesenrad in Vienna. One of the coins is displayed in the foyer of the Munich headquarters of precious metals company Pro Aurum.

20-ounce gold coin 

For the 20th anniversary of the Vienna Philharmonic coin, the Austrian Mint created a new size of the coin. This coin has a face value of 2,000 euros and a fine weight of 20 troy ounces or 622 grams. At the time of issue in October 2009, the material value was around 14,000 euros. Due to the limited minting, the coin was sold at a premium of approximately 10 percent above gold price. The total circulation of these coins was 6,027 (providing 2,009 coins in each of the European, American, and Japanese markets), which were sold in velvet-lined wooden cases with certificates.

Mintage figures

Gold

Platinum

Silver

See also 
 Bullion
 Bullion coin
 Euro gold and silver commemorative coins (Austria)
 Gold as an investment
 Inflation hedge
 Platinum as an investment
 Silver as an investment

References

External links 
 Vienna Philharmonic at the official website of the Austrian Mint
 Austrian Bullion Coins – Online Coin Club

Bullion coins of Austria
Gold bullion coins
Silver bullion coins
Platinum bullion coins
Euro coins
Vienna Philharmonic